The Cunninghamellaceae are a family of fungi in the order Mucorales.

Taxonomy
At one time, this family contained four genera. At present, the number of genera in this family is under debate. According to Benny and Alexopoulos, the family only contains the genus Cunninghamella. However, other (recent) authors have listed other genera, including Absidia, Halteromyces, and Hesseltinella. The full list can be viewed at the webpage Cunninghamellaceae maintained by Gerald L. Benny.

Morphology
Hyphae are coenocytic and produce sporangiophores covered in calcium oxalate. Sporangiophores give rise to pedicellate, unispored sporangia. In many cases, the wall of the sporangium and the spore have fused. Zygospores tend to be ornamented and reddish-brown with opposed suspensors.

Ecology
Cunninghamella species are commonly encountered in forest soils, dung, and nuts from the tropics. Species can be isolated using Czapek medium incubated for 3–4 days at 28-31C. A few species are known human pathogens.

References

External links
Family page on Zygomycetes.org

 
Fungus families